Alfred Burnell (14 June 1924 – 25 August 2019), also known by the nickname of "Ginger", was an English professional rugby league footballer who played in the 1930s, 1940s and 1950s. During World War II, Burnell served in the Royal Navy, and spent four years as a submariner on detachment as part of the United States task force in Australasia.

Background
Burnell's birth was registered in Hunslet district, South Leeds, West Riding of Yorkshire, England, he was a submariner in the Royal Navy during World War II, as of August 2016, he lived in Wharfedale in the Yorkshire Dales, he died aged 95 in St James's University Hospital, Leeds, West Yorkshire, England, and his funeral will take place at St Wilfred's Parish Church, Pool-in-Wharfedale, LS21 1RY, at 2:15pm on Thursday 12 September 2019, followed by a reception at the South Leeds Stadium, Phoenix Bar, LS11 5DJ.

International honours
Burnell won caps for England while at Hunslet in 1950 against France, in 1951 against Wales, and France, in 1952 against Wales, won caps for British Empire XIII while at Hunslet in ±1945 against ?-caps, and won caps for Great Britain while at Hunslet in 1951 against New Zealand (2 matches), and in 1954 against New Zealand.

References

External links
Wartime sketching has 60-year sequel
(archived by web.archive.org) Britain hold out Kiwis at Odsal
Up And Under - The Rugby League Oral History - Alf Burnell
(archived by archive.is) U.K. League Hooker in Doubt
Alf's hairy moment

1924 births
2019 deaths
British Empire rugby league team players
England national rugby league team players
English rugby league players
Great Britain national rugby league team players
Hunslet F.C. (1883) players
Leeds Rhinos players
People from Hunslet
Royal Navy personnel of World War II
Royal Navy submariners
Rugby league halfbacks
Rugby league players from Yorkshire
Yorkshire rugby league team players